The Davie County Enterprise-Record is a weekly newspaper based in Mocksville, North Carolina that serves Davie County, North Carolina. The editor of the paper is Mike Barnhardt. The Evening Post Publishing Company owned the paper from 1997 to 2014, when it was acquired by Boone Newspapers.

Staff
Current staff includes Mike Barnhardt, Brian Pitts, Robin Snow, and Ray Tutterow.

See also
 List of newspapers published in North Carolina

References

External links
 Official website

Weekly newspapers published in North Carolina